Alycia Delmore (born 1977) is an American actress in films and theater.

Early life and education
Delmore was born in Seattle, Washington.  She attended Roosevelt High School and studied at Western Washington University.

Career
She is most famous for her role in Lynn Shelton's 2009 comedy film Humpday in the role of Anna, the wife of Ben (played by Mark Duplass). She also appears in Shelton's What The Funny in the role of Sarah.

She plays Kyler Mallory, fictional London stock broker in Her Interactive Inc's video game, Nancy Drew: The Haunting of Castle Malloy. She also landed a role in Seattle Shakespeare Company's Pericles. In 2015, Delmore joined the cast of Wes Hurley's acclaimed comedy series Capitol Hill along with Jinkx Monsoon, Guinevere Turner and Sarah Rudinoff.

Filmography

Film

Television

Video games

References

External links

American film actresses
Living people
American video game actresses
1977 births
Place of birth missing (living people)
21st-century American women